State Route 218 (SR 218) is a north–south state highway in the southern portion of the U.S. state of Ohio.

Route description
State Route 218 travels through portions of Lawrence and Gallia.  There are no segments of this state route that are incorporated within the  National Highway System.

History
When it was first established in 1924, State Route 218 consisted of the entirety of the current routing of State Route 553 from State Route 7 in Crown City northwesterly to its junction with State Route 218, and the current alignment of State Route 218 from the State Route 553 intersection northeasterly to its current northern terminus at State Route 7 south of Gallipolis.  Two years later, the southern end of the highway was re-aligned.  From its current junction with State Route 553, State Route 218 was routed southwesterly along a previously un-numbered roadway to what is now State Route 218's southern terminus at State Route 217.

Major intersections

References

External links

State Route 218 Endpoint Photos

218
Transportation in Gallia County, Ohio
Transportation in Lawrence County, Ohio